= Fred Bemment =

English footballer

Personal information
- Full name: Frederick Charles Bemment
- Date of birth: 12 October 1884
- Place of birth: Lowestoft, England
- Date of death: 1957 (aged 72–73)
- Position: Wing half

Senior career*
Years	Team	Apps	(Gls)
1903–1904	Lowestoft IOGT		
1904–1905	Kirkley		
1905–1907	Norwich City		
1907–1908	Notts County	9	(0)
1908–1909	Chesterfield Town	29	(1)
1909	Hardwick Colliery		
Total		38	(1)
- * Club domestic league appearances and goals

Frederick Charles Bemment (12 October 1884 – 1957) was an English footballer who played in the Football League for Chesterfield Town and Notts County.
